Manilkara kanosiensis (commonly known as torem or sawai) is a species of tree in the sapodilla family. It is thinly dispersed in low-lying rainforests over a large range, from the Maluku Islands of Indonesia to the Bismarck Archipelago (New Britain and New Ireland) of Papua New Guinea. It is endangered by the furious pace of logging in its native habitat, where it is felled as timber.

References

kanosiensis
Plants described in 1941
Endangered plants
Trees of the Maluku Islands
Flora of the Bismarck Archipelago
Taxonomy articles created by Polbot